Wavell State High School is a coeducational independent public secondary school based in Wavell Heights, City of Brisbane, Queensland, Australia. The school has a total enrolment of more than 1500 students from years 7–12, with an official count of 1674 students in 2019. Since 2021, the role of Executive Principal of the School has been held by Elizabeth Foster.

Some of the school's buildings are listed on the Queensland Heritage Register.

History

Wavell State High School opened on 27 January 1959 under the leadership of the founding Principal, C.E. Anstey. As the suburb of the school, Wavell Heights, which was named in 1942, Wavell State High School was named after Field Marshal Archibald Percival Wavell, 1st Earl Wavell (5 May 1883 – 24 May 1950), a Commander-in-Chief of British and Dominion Forces in the Middle East from July 1939 to July 1941. Many Australians served under his command during the early period of World War II; mostly in North Africa, Greece, Crete and Syria.

In 2018 many of the original buildings received State Government Heritage Listing due to their cultural and historical significance.

In early 2021, Jeff Major, the school's 8th and longest serving principal, announced he was going on extended leave to finalise his retirement plans. Replacing him, is MacGregor's Elizabeth Foster.

Sporting houses

Wavell State High School's four sporting houses, Alamein, Burma, Keren and Tobruk, are named in reference to places and battles associated with Earl Wavell:

 Alamein commemorates the Second Battle of El Alamein, the turning point of World War II in the Middle East. After two frustrating years of successes followed by reverses, British and Dominion forces led by Lt. General Bernard Montgomery successfully fought this decisive battle from 23 October to 4 November 1942 near El Alamein, in Northern Egypt, not far from Alexandria and Cairo. The Australian Ninth Division had an important role in the battle. The German and Italian Armies subsequently retreated to Tunis where they surrendered in May 1943.
 Burma, part of Wavell's responsibilities as Commander-in-Chief of the south-West Pacific, was invaded in December 1941 by the Japanese Army who gained control of the country by May 1942.  This occupation posed threats for India and Ceylon and severed the Chinese nationalists' main line of communication with the outside world via the port of Rangoon.  Allied policy was that Germany should be defeated before Japan and only limited resources were available to assist Wavell and his successors.  However, operations by soldiers known as Chindits were organised behind enemy lines during Wavell's time as Commander-in-Chief.  Australian Air Force and Navy personnel were among those Allied forces who retook Burma in 1945.
 Keren was the location of a decisive and bitter battle from 15 to 26 March 1941 in which British troops defeated Italian troops, paving the way for British control of East Africa and thereby removing some of the threat posed by the Axis powers to British interests in the Mediterranean. British success in March followed an earlier unsuccessful attempt to secure the area in a battle from 3 to 13 February. The town of Keren is located in a mountain area in the north of Eritrea, near the Red Sea. At the time, Eritrea was one of the six provinces of Italian East Africa.
 Tobruk was the scene of a siege in which allied servicemen defended the town against the German Army from 10 April to 7 December 1941. This siege of 242 days is the longest in British Military history. The defenders, who were outnumbered ten to three, included Australians of the Ninth Division and a Brigade of the Seventh Division, as well as troops from Britain, India and Poland. By holding this strategic port in Libya the Allies were able to thwart the progress of the German Armies in their quest to control Egypt and the Suez Canal. The Rats of Tobruk Association, survivors of the siege, donated a debating trophy which is presented each year at Wavell State High School's Wavell Speech Night.

Curriculum

Schools of Excellence

Wavell State High School includes Schools of Excellence in the fields of Netball, Rugby League, Dance, Drama and Music:
 Cert II Sport and Recreation (SIS20310) – Netball Excellence strand
 Cert II Sport and Recreation (SIS20310) – Rugby League Excellence strand
 Creative Arts – Dance Studies
 Creative Arts – Drama Studies
 Music Extension

Junior secondary (Years 7 & 8)

Years 7 and 8 students at Wavell State High School participate in the following subjects:

 English
 Extension
 Core
 Foundation
 Mathematics
 Extension
 Core
 Foundation
 Science
 Languages
 French
 German
 Japanese
 Social Science
 History
 Geography
 Technology
 Business and Computing
 Home Economics
 Industrial Technology
 Media Studies
 The Arts
 Visual Arts
 Dance
 Drama
 Music
 Health & Physical Education

Middle secondary (Years 9 & 10)

Years 9 and 10 students at Wavell State High School undertake the following subjects as a part of their curriculum:

 English
 Extension
 Core
 Foundation
 Mathematics
 Extension
 Core
 Foundation
 Health & Physical Education
 General
 Health & Movement
 Rugby League
 Netball
 Social Science
 History
 Geography
 Science
 Wavell Development Program/Assembly
 Sport

All Year 9 students at Wavell State High School undertake three of the following Elective Subjects:
 Technology
 Business Studies
 Digital Technology
 Engineering Design
 Food and Textiles Studies
 Food Studies
 Industrial Skills
 Visual Design Technologies
 The Arts Program
 Art
 Dance (enrolment succeeds by satisfactory audition)
 Drama
 Media Studies
 Music
 Languages (students choose which one they prefer from best to least)
 French
 German
 Japanese

In Year 10, the three electives plus HPE are condensed into two elective subjects.

Senior secondary (Years 11 & 12)

Wavell State High School offers Queensland Curriculum and Assessment Authority (QCAA) General Subjects, Applied Subjects and Vocational Education & Training (VET) subjects to Years 11 and 12 students.

QCAA General Subjects

 Accounting
 Ancient History
 Biology
 Business
 Chemistry
 Dance
 Design
 Digital Solutions
 Drama
 Earth & Environmental Science
 Economics
 Engineering
 English
 English & Literature Extension (Year 12 only)
 Film, Television and New Media
 Food & Nutrition
 French
 General Mathematics
 Geography
 German
 Graphics
 Health
 Japanese
 Legal Studies
 Literature
 Mathematical Methods
 Modern History
 Music
 Music Extension – Composition (Excellence Program; Year 12 only)
 Music Extension – Musicology (Excellence Program; Year 12 only)
 Music Extension – Performance (Excellence Program; Year 12 only)
 Physical Education
 Physics
 Specialist Mathematics
 Visual Art

Applied Subjects

 Dance in Practice (Excellence Program)
 Drama in Practice (Excellence Program)
 Early Childhood Studies
 Essential English
 Essential Mathematics
 Fashion
 Furnishing Skills
 Hospitality Practices
 Information Technology Skills
 Information & Community Studies
 Media Arts in Practice
 Social and Community Studies
 Sport & Recreation (Rugby League Excellence Strand)
 Visual Arts in Practice

VET Subjects

 Certificate II in Engineering Pathways
 Certificate II in Horticulture
 Certificate III in Allied Health Assistance
 Certificate III in Business
 Certificate III in Early Childhood Education and Care
 Certificate III in Engineering – Technical (CAD)
 Certificate III in Sport and Recreation – (General Strand)
 Certificate III in Sport and Recreation – (Netball Excellence Program)
 Certificate IV in Justice Studies

Notable alumni
 Jason Akermanis, Australian Rules footballer
 Adam Blair, rugby league footballer
 Madonna Blyth, field hockey player
Darryl Brohman, rugby league footballer, commentator and media personality
Josh Brown (cricketer), cricket player
Naomi Castle, Waterpolo, 2000 & 2004 Olympics.  Gold 2000 Olympics in Sydney. Captain (2004).
 Anthony Chisholm, Senator 
Delvene Delaney, Actress and Fashion Model
 Ashley Harrison, rugby league footballer
 Greg Inglis, rugby league footballer
Joyce Lester OAM, Softball, 1996 Olympics Bronze Medal, Team member 1977–1996, Captain (1985–1996)
 Jayden Nikorima, rugby league footballer
 Kodi Nikorima, rugby league footballer
Rob Rosenlund, Whickety-Whack show band keyboardist
 Jessica and Lisa Origliasso of The Veronicas
Brianna Thompson, English Channel Swimmer
 Shane Tronc, rugby league footballer
 Jake Webster, rugby league footballer
 Sandra Yost, Commonwealth Games Swimmer 1974 Gold 200m Butterfly, Silver 200m Backstroke, Bronze 100m Butterfly
Sir Ross Cranston, High Court of Justice of England and Wales

References

External links

Public high schools in Brisbane
Educational institutions established in 1959
1959 establishments in Australia